The 2020 German Indoor Athletics Championships was the 67th edition of the national championship in indoor track and field for Germany. It was held on 22–23 February at the Arena Leipzig in Leipzig. A total of 24 events, 12 for men and 12 for women, were contested. It was to serve as preparation for the 2020 World Athletics Indoor Championships, which was postponed due to the COVID-19 outbreak in China before the German championships.

Several national championship events were staged elsewhere: combined events were held on 1–2 February in Leverkusen, relays were held on 16 February in Neubrandenburg, while racewalking events were hosted in Erfurt on 28 February.

Results

Men

Women

References

Results
 Medalists
 Results
 Combined Events Results

German Indoor Athletics Championships
German Indoor Athletics Championships
German Indoor Athletics Championships
German Indoor Athletics Championships
Sports competitions in Leipzig